Euphorbia grantii is a species of succulent plant in the family Euphorbiaceae.

Name 
The specific epithet is in honour of explorer James Augustus Grant. It was originally described by Daniel Oliver in 1875. The plant has the common name of African milk bush. 
The synonym Synadenium grantii is in circulation, too.

Distribution 
The plant is native in the African tropics, in particular in Malawi, Kenya and Uganda.
It grows at altitudes of 500–2100 meters.  It has been introduced in many other tropical regions.

Usage 
It is often grown as a hedge plant and as a traditional grave marker among the peoples of central Kenya (Agĩkũyũ, Akamba, etc.).

In 1952 during the Mau Mau Uprising, the poisonous latex of the plant was used to kill cattle.

Gallery

References

External links

grantii
Plants described in 1875
Taxa named by Daniel Oliver